Bengough was a provincial electoral district for the Legislative Assembly of Saskatchewan, Canada. This constituency was created the 1917 Saskatchewan general election. It was redistributed before the 1971 Saskatchewan general election.

Member of the Legislative Assembly

Election results

|-

|Conservative
|William Wallace Davidson
|align="right"|1,121
|align="right"|35.87
|align="right"|-
|- bgcolor="white"
!align="left" colspan=3|Total
!align="right"|3,125
!align="right"|100.00
!align="right"|

|-

|Independent
|Edgar Alfred Devlin
|align="right"|762
|align="right"|29.59
|align="right"|-
|- bgcolor="white"
!align="left" colspan=3|Total
!align="right"|2,575
!align="right"|100.00
!align="right"|

|-

|- bgcolor="white"
!align="left" colspan=3|Total
!align="right"|2,941
!align="right"|100.00
!align="right"|

|-

|style="width: 130px"|Conservative
|Herman Kersler Warren
|align="right"|2,090
|align="right"|44.79
|align="right"|+44.79

|- bgcolor="white"
!align="left" colspan=3|Total
!align="right"|4,666
!align="right"|100.00
!align="right"|

|-

|Conservative
|Herman Kersler Warren
|align="right"|2,052
|align="right"|37.78
|align="right"|-7.00

|Farmer-Labour
|William Francis Jordan
|align="right"|1,257
|align="right"|23.14
|align="right"|+23.14
|- bgcolor="white"
!align="left" colspan=3|Total
!align="right"|5,431
!align="right"|100.00
!align="right"|

|- bgcolor="white"
!align="left" colspan=3|Total
!align="right"|6,489
!align="right"|100.00
!align="right"|

|-

|style="width: 130px"|CCF
|Allan Lister Samuel Brown
|align="right"|3,847
|align="right"|60.87
|align="right"|-

|- bgcolor="white"
!align="left" colspan=3|Total
!align="right"|6,320
!align="right"|100.00
!align="right"|

|-

|style="width: 130px"|CCF
|Allan Lister Samuel Brown
|align="right"|3,599
|align="right"|51.92
|align="right"|-8.94

|- bgcolor="white"
!align="left" colspan=3|Total
!align="right"|6,931
!align="right"|100.00
!align="right"|

|-

|style="width: 130px"|CCF
|Allan Lister Samuel Brown
|align="right"|3,757
|align="right"|58.05
|align="right"|+6.12

|- bgcolor="white"
!align="left" colspan=3|Total
!align="right"|6,472
!align="right"|100.00
!align="right"|

|-

|style="width: 130px"|CCF
|Allan Lister Samuel Brown
|align="right"|2,685
|align="right"|41.86
|align="right"|-16.18

|- bgcolor="white"
!align="left" colspan=3|Total
!align="right"|6,413
!align="right"|100.00
!align="right"|

|-

|style="width: 130px"|CCF
|Hjalmar Reinhold Dahlman
|align="right"|2,541
|align="right"|41.17
|align="right"|-0.69

|PC
|Harold Bateson
|align="right"|707
|align="right"|11.45
|align="right"|-

|- bgcolor="white"
!align="left" colspan=3|Total
!align="right"|6,171
!align="right"|100.00
!align="right"|

|-

|CCF
|Hjalmar Reinhold Dahlman
|align="right"|2,311
|align="right"|37.78
|align="right"|-3.39

|PC
|Roy Hardeman Bailey
|align="right"|1,192
|align="right"|19.48
|align="right"|+8.03
|- bgcolor="white"
!align="left" colspan=3|Total
!align="right"|6116
!align="right"|100.00
!align="right"|

|-

|CCF
|Hjalmar Reinhold Dahlman
|align="right"|2,285
|align="right"|40.30
|align="right"|+2.52

|PC
|George W. Spicer
|align="right"|961
|align="right"|16.95
|align="right"|-2.53
|- bgcolor="white"
!align="left" colspan=3|Total
!align="right"|5,669
!align="right"|100.00
!align="right"|

|-

|Prog. Conservative
|Jim Hall
|align="right"|723
|align="right"|13.57
|align="right"|-3.37
|- bgcolor="white"
!align="left" colspan=3|Total
!align="right"|5,325
!align="right"|100.00
!align="right"|

See also
Electoral district (Canada)
List of Saskatchewan provincial electoral districts
List of Saskatchewan general elections
List of political parties in Saskatchewan

References
 Saskatchewan Archives Board: Saskatchewan Executive and Legislative Directory

Former provincial electoral districts of Saskatchewan